FC Fargo was an American Semi-Professional soccer team based in Fargo, North Dakota. The team was sanctioned by the United States Adult Soccer Association (USASA) as a member of the American Premier League

History

Founded in 2015 to give soccer players in Fargo-Moorhead and the Great Plains region a chance to play competitive soccer beyond their high school years and allow for younger athletes to progress to higher division teams.

The first head coach is Tommy Nienhaus, who is also head coach of the University of Jamestown Jimmies men's soccer program.

The team held its first open combine March 29, 2015.

FC Fargo began play in Summer of 2015 with an exhibition schedule. The team played at Sid Cichy Stadium at Shanley High School in Fargo, Lodoen Center in West Fargo and Moorhead High School in its inaugural, exhibition, season. Its inaugural match was against FC Minneapolis of the American Premier League at Moorhead High School on June 27, 2015.

On August 23, 2016 it was announced via Twitter that the team would cease operations due to financial issues.

Club Culture
Supporters Group: The main supporters group for the club is the Fargo Green Army.

The club mascot is a Green Moose named "Meanie" after the Mean Green nickname.

Players and Staff

First Team Players
as of 3 May 2015

Managers 
   Tommy Nienhaus (2015)

Season-by-season results

References

External links
FC Fargo official website
Official blog of FC Fargo
Fargo Green Army blog

2015 establishments in North Dakota
Association football clubs established in 2015
Association football clubs disestablished in 2016
Sports in Fargo, North Dakota
Defunct soccer clubs in North Dakota
Defunct sports teams in North Dakota
2016 disestablishments in North Dakota
Moorhead, Minnesota
Soccer clubs in Minnesota